Overture is a 1958 Canadian short documentary film directed by Gian Luigi Polidoro. It was nominated for an Academy Award for Best Documentary Short. The film depicts the peacekeeping efforts of the United Nations, set against the music of Beethoven's Egmont Overture, performed by the Vienna Philharmonic Orchestra.

References

External links

1958 films
1958 documentary films
1958 short films
1950s Italian-language films
National Film Board of Canada documentaries
Films about the United Nations
United Nations peacekeeping
Black-and-white documentary films
Sponsored films
Films directed by Gian Luigi Polidoro
Canadian short documentary films
1950s Canadian films